The 11th Legislative Assembly of Ontario was in session from January 25, 1905, until May 2, 1908, just prior to the 1908 general election. The majority party was the Ontario Conservative Party  led by Sir James P. Whitney.

The Commissioner of Crown Lands became the Minister of Lands, Forests and Mines. The Commissioner of Public Works became the Minister of Public Works. An Electrical Power Commission was formed to consider the feasibility of delivering electrical power generated at Niagara Falls to industrial centres in the province.

Joseph Wesley St. John served as speaker for the assembly until his death on April 7, 1907. Thomas Crawford succeeded St. John as speaker.

Notes

References 
A History of Ontario : its resources and development., Alexander Fraser
Members in Parliament 11 

1905 establishments in Ontario
1908 disestablishments in Ontario
Terms of the Legislative Assembly of Ontario